The 2016–17 season is West Ham Uniteds fifth campaign in the Premier League since being promoted in the 2011–12 season. It is West Ham's 21st Premier League campaign overall and their 59th top flight appearance in their 122nd year in existence, and their first in the Olympic Stadium.

As well as competing in the Premier League, West Ham United took part in the FA Cup and League Cup, entering at the third round in both competitions. Despite finishing outside of the UEFA Europa League places in the 2015–16 Premier League, West Ham participated in the 2016–17 UEFA Europa League as a result of Manchester United winning the 2016 FA Cup Final.

Club

Kits
Supplier: Umbro / Sponsor: betWay

Competitions

Overview

Goalscorers

Transfers

Transfers in

Transfers out

Loans in

Loans out

Notes

References

External links
 West Ham United FC Official Website

West Ham United
West Ham United F.C. seasons
West Ham United
West Ham United
West Ham United